is a Japanese football player. He plays for Hokkaido Tokachi Sky Earth.

Playing career
Toshihiro Horikawa played for Kamatamare Sanuki from 2012 to 2015. In 2016, he moved to Suzuka Unlimited FC.

Club statistics
Updated to 22 January 2020.

References

External links

1989 births
Living people
Ryutsu Keizai University alumni
Association football people from Kagawa Prefecture
Japanese footballers
J2 League players
Japan Football League players
Kamatamare Sanuki players
Suzuka Point Getters players
Association football midfielders